Leslie Hunter (born 5 January 1958) is an English former professional footballer who played as a centre-back.

Career
Born in Middlesbrough, Hunter played for Chesterfield, Scunthorpe United, Lincoln City and Matlock Town.

References

1958 births
Living people
English footballers
Chesterfield F.C. players
Scunthorpe United F.C. players
Lincoln City F.C. players
Matlock Town F.C. players
English Football League players
Association football defenders
Footballers from Middlesbrough